This was the final appearance for Philipp Kohlschreiber before his retirement.

Seeds

Qualifiers

Lucky losers

Draw

First qualifier

Second qualifier

Third qualifier

Fourth qualifier

Fifth qualifier

Sixth qualifier

Seventh qualifier

Eighth qualifier

Ninth qualifier

Tenth qualifier

Eleventh qualifier

Twelfth qualifier

Thirteenth qualifier

Fourteenth qualifier

Fifteenth qualifier

Sixteenth qualifier

References

External links
 Entry List
 Draw
 Draw
 Qualifying

Men's Singles Qualifying
Wimbledon Championships – Men's Singles Qualifying
2022